John Schuette was a member of the Wisconsin State Senate.

Biography
Schuette was born on September 25, 1837 in Oldenburg, Germany. He moved to Cedarburg, Wisconsin in 1848.

In 1867, Schuette married Rosa Stauss. They would have five children before her death in 1904. Schuette died of a myocardial infarction on December 20, 1919 in Manitowoc, Wisconsin.

Career
Schuette was a member of the Senate from 1875 to 1876. Additionally, he was an alderman and Mayor of Manitowoc. He was a Republican.

References

People from Oldenburg (city)
German emigrants to the United States
People from Cedarburg, Wisconsin
People from Manitowoc, Wisconsin
Republican Party Wisconsin state senators
Mayors of places in Wisconsin
Wisconsin city council members
1837 births
1919 deaths
19th-century American politicians